The Bulgarian identity card (Bulgarian: лична карта, lichna karta, literal translation: 'personal card') is a compulsory identity document issued in Bulgaria. The document is issued by the police on behalf of the Ministry of Interior and is the main form of identification on the territory of the Republic of Bulgaria. All Bulgarians are obliged by law to carry their identity cards with them at all times and are subject to fines should they not.

Since 1 January 2007, the Bulgarian identity card can be used for travel within the European Union and the Schengen Area instead of a Bulgarian passport. In addition, the Bulgarian identity card is accepted as a travel document by European microstates, the French overseas territories, Montserrat (max. 14 days), Albania, Bosnia and Herzegovina, Georgia, Kosovo, Moldova, Montenegro, North Cyprus, North Macedonia, Serbia and Turkey.

History
The Bulgarian identity card (лична карта in the Cyrillic alphabet, or "lichna karta" in the Latin transliteration of Bulgarian) is first issued and is compulsory after turning 14 years of age. The new Bulgarian ID cards were introduced in 1999. They follow the general pattern in the EU and replaced the old, Soviet-style "internal passports", also known as "green passports". Since 29 March 2010 new Bulgarian identity cards were introduced.

Physical appearance
The physical appearance of the Bulgarian identity card is similar to that of a credit card, the identity card is plastic and rounded-rectangular in shape. On the left side is the photograph of the bearer. On the top edge of the card, the name Republic of Bulgaria is available in two languages, Bulgarian and English, written in capital letters, below, the name of the card is available in the same two languages and also written in capital letters. The middle part of the flag of the Republic of Bulgaria and the Coat of Arms of the Republic of Bulgaria are also displayed on the identity card.

Furthermore, the following information is contained on the front side of the card:

 The unique 9-digit ID number of the card
 The cardholder's full name, sex, and date of birth
 The cardholder's uniform civil number (Bulgarian: единен граждански номер; abbreviated ЕГН, EGN): a unique 10-digit number that serves as national identification number
 Date of expiry of the card
 Cardholder's signature

The back side of the identity card contains the cardholder's family name, place of birth, permanent address, height, and eye color, as well as the place where the card was issued together with the date of issue. At the bottom there is a machine-readable zone according to ICAO specifications.

Obtaining an identity card
In order to be issued an identity card, one needs to fill in a form, which should be taken to the Identity Documents and Passport Regime Units within the District Police Stations. The forms could be obtained at all District Police Stations. When applying a digital picture of the person is taken, and—in the case of applying for a passport at the same time—fingerprints of the thumbs of the applicant. First-time applicants (i.e. persons turning 14) must also provide a valid birth certificate. It is possible for a person to apply for a renewal of the ID card via a representative with a notary signed permit, provided there are no significant changes in his or her appearance. There are, however limitations. If you apply via a representative, you must receive the new ID yourself. Vice versa, if you applied yourself, then an authorized representative may receive your ID. This does not apply to applying for passports, as fingerprints must be taken.

A monetary tax is paid for the issuing of the identity card; the price depends on the selected type of issuing which is basically the time needed for the card to be issued (the prices are listed in District Police Stations). The standard time for issuing a Bulgarian identity card is 30 days. There are, however, express services that allow you to apply for a 3-work day issuance period or even 8-hour service. The issuance fee is doubled for the 3-work day period and quintupled for the 8-hour service. If you apply for a standard 30-day service there is a great chance your ID card will be ready way before that. The Ministry of Interior has provided an online service that allows you to check whether your ID card is ready.

For people ages 14 to 18 years, the identity cards are valid for four years, while citizens ages 18–58 are issued cards with 10-year validity; citizens over 58 years old are issued identity cards with no expiration date.

Gallery of historic images

See also

 National identity cards in the European Union
 National identity cards in the European Economic Area
 Citizenship of the European Union
 Bulgarian passport
 Bulgarian nationality law
 Uniform civil number
 Driving licence in Bulgaria
 Visa requirements for Bulgarian citizens
 Visa policy of Bulgaria
 List of identity card policies by country

References

External links
E-services of the Bulgarian Ministry of Interior:
  Personal documents validity check
  Check if a personal document is ready to be picked up
 Official information about the issuing of Bulgarian identity cards from the Bulgarian Ministry of Interior.

Government of Bulgaria
National identity cards by country